Kŭmya station is a railway station in North Korea. It is located on the P'yŏngra Line of the Korean State Railway, and is the starting point of the Kŭmya Line.

History
The station was originally opened by the Chosen Government Railway as Yŏnghŭng station, and received its current name after the establishment of the DPRK.

References

Railway stations in North Korea